Lakewood Historic District may refer to:

Lakewood Historic District (Birmingham, Alabama), listed on the NRHP in Birmingham, Alabama
Lakewood Heights Historic District (Atlanta, Georgia), NRHP-listed

See also 
 Lakewood Balmoral Historic District, Chicago, IL, listed on the NRHP in Illinois
 Lakewood Commercial District, listed on the NRHP in Davidson County, Tennessee